__notoc__
Eugenio Donato (17 August 1937 – 19 September 1983) was an Armenian-Italian deconstructionist, literary critic, and "philosophical critic".  Raised in Egypt, and educated in France, he played an important role in teaching Americans how to read post-structural theory. 

He edited, with Richard A. Macksey, the book The Structuralist Controversy: The Languages of Criticism and the Sciences of Man.

Donato died on September 19, 1983, aged 56.

See also
Rodolphe Gasché (he currently holds the Eugenio Donato Chair of Comparative Literature at the University at Buffalo)
Jacques Derrida
Critical theory
Deconstruction
Gustave Flaubert

References

Sources
Library of Congress
Paris to the Moon (2000) Gopnik, Adam: Vintage Publishing

External links

Texts
http://www.worldcatlibraries.org/search?q=au%3AEugenio+Donato&qt=hot_author
http://www.allbookstores.com/author/Eugenio_Donato.html

Archival collections
Guide to the Eugenio Donato Papers MS.C.009. Special Collections and Archives, The UC Irvine Libraries, Irvine, California.
Guide to the Marli Shoop Audio Recordings of Eugenio Donato and Wolfgang Iser Lectures. Special Collections and Archives, The UC Irvine Libraries, Irvine, California.

1937 births
1983 deaths
Critical theorists